An X-Value Adjustment (XVA, xVA) is an umbrella term referring to a number of different “valuation adjustments” that banks must make when assessing the value of derivative contracts that they have entered into. The purpose of these is twofold: primarily to hedge for possible losses due to other parties' failures to pay amounts due on the derivative contracts; but also to determine (and hedge) the amount of capital required under the bank capital adequacy rules.  XVA has led to the creation of specialized desks in many banking institutions to manage XVA exposures.

Context
Historically, (OTC) derivative pricing has relied on the Black–Scholes risk neutral pricing framework which assumes that funding is available at the risk free rate and that traders can perfectly replicate derivatives so as to fully hedge.  
This, in turn, assumes that derivatives can be traded without taking on credit risk. During the financial crisis of 2008 many financial institutions failed, leaving their counterparts with claims on derivative contracts that were paid only in part. Therefore counterparty credit risk must also be considered in derivatives valuation, and the risk neutral value is then adjusted correspondingly.

Valuation adjustments
When a derivative's exposure is collateralized, the "fair-value" is computed as before, but using the overnight index swap (OIS) curve for discounting. The OIS is chosen here as it reflects the rate for overnight secured lending between banks, and is thus considered a good indicator of the interbank credit markets.  When the exposure is not collateralized then a credit valuation adjustment, or CVA, is subtracted from this value   (the logic: an institution  insists on paying less for the option, knowing that the counterparty may default on its unrealized gain); this CVA is the discounted risk-neutral expectation value of the loss expected due to the counterparty not paying in accordance with the contractual terms.  This is typically calculated under a simulation framework.

Note that when transactions are governed by a master agreement that includes netting-off of contract exposures, then the expected loss from a default depends on the net exposure of the whole portfolio of derivative trades outstanding under the agreement rather than being calculated on a transaction-by-transaction basis. The CVA (and xVA) applied to a new transaction should be the incremental effect of the new transaction on the portfolio CVA.

While the CVA reflects the market value of counterparty credit risk, additional Valuation Adjustments for debit, funding cost, regulatory capital and margin may similarly be added. As with CVA, these results are modeled via simulation as a function of the risk-neutral expectation of (a) the values of the underlying instrument and the relevant market values, and (b) the creditworthiness of the counterparty. Note that the various XVA require careful and correct aggregation to avoid double counting.

These adjustments include:
DVA, Debit Valuation Adjustment: analogous to CVA, the adjustment (increment) to a derivative price due to the institution's own default risk. If the default risk of both counterparties is properly taken into account in the CVA/DVA calculation, the CVA/DVA computed by one counterparty is equal to the DVA/CVA computed by the other counterparty, i.e. the price of the trade is unique and symmetric.
FVA, Funding Valuation Adjustment, due to the funding implications of a trade that is not under Credit Support Annex (CSA), or is under a partial CSA; essentially the funding cost or benefit due to the difference between the funding rate of the bank's treasury and the collateral (variation margin) rate paid by a clearing house.
MVA, Margin Valuation Adjustment, refers to the funding costs of the initial margin specific to centrally cleared transactions. It may be calculated according to the global rules for non-centrally cleared derivatives rules.
KVA, the Valuation Adjustment for regulatory capital that must be held by the Institution against the exposure throughout the life of the contract (lately applying SA-CCR).

Other adjustments are also sometimes made including TVA, for tax, and RVA, for replacement of the derivative on downgrade. FVA may be decomposed into FCA for receivables and FBA for payables - where FCA is due to self-funded borrowing spread over Libor, and FBA due to self funded lending.  Relatedly, LVA represents the specific liquidity adjustment, while CollVA is the value of the optionality embedded in a CSA to post collateral in different currencies. CRA, the collateral rate adjustment, reflects the present value of the expected excess of net interest paid on cash collateral over the net interest that would be paid if the interest rate equaled the risk-free rate.  As mentioned, the various XVA require careful and correct aggregation to avoid double counting.

For a discussion as to the impact of xVA on banks overall balance sheets, return on equity, and dividend policy, see:

References

Bibliography

 

Mathematical finance
Credit risk
Derivatives (finance)
Financial risk modeling
Monte Carlo methods in finance